Bank Brussels Lambert (BBL) was a Belgian bank that was created through merger in 1975 and became part of ING Group in 1998.  It provided retail and commercial banking services to individuals and businesses in Belgium, together with related financial products such as insurance and asset management.

It was formed by the merger of two existing Belgian banks Banque de Bruxelles and Banque Lambert in 1975 making it at that time the second largest Belgian bank.  It was sold to ING Group in 1998 who renamed the subsidiary in 2002 ING Belgium.

History

Banque de Bruxelles
Banque de Bruxelles was founded in 1871 and grew steadily over the ensuing six decades, acquiring interests in other banks in Belgium's major cities. In 1931, these interests were combined in a single business which operated in traditional banking and in the management of industrial concerns based mainly in Belgium and Africa. Following the reform of the Belgian banking sector in 1934–35, the commercial banking activities were transferred to a new company formed on 30 January 1935 under the same registered name. As required by the reform, this transfer separated the banking and holding company functions.

Banque Lambert
Banque Lambert had its origins in the banking house founded by the Lambert family, financiers in Belgium since the country's independence in 1830. After 1945, Banque Lambert rapidly developed its services and network, notably through the merger of a number of privately owned banks.

Merger
What had been planned as an absorption of Banque Lambert by the Banque de Bruxelles became a merger in 1975, with Banque Lambert headed by Baron Leon Lambert having a position of strength. This was after Banque de Bruxelles was hit by a loss of several billion Belgian francs after one of its traders took a position that went wrong.

Take over
The bank was purchased by the Dutch ING Group in 1998 and subsequently renamed ING Belgium.

Headquarters
The headquarters of BBL (now an office of ING Group) was the Bank Lambert building on Marnixlaan 24, Brussels.  This modernist building was the only European building designed by the American architect Gordon Bunshaft making it one of the most important modernist architectural buildings in Belgium.

References

External links

 

Banks of Belgium
ING Group
1975 establishments in Belgium
Belgian companies established in 1975
Defunct banks of Belgium